Julien Schwarzer (born 6 April 1993), known professionally as SCH, is a French rapper from Marseille.

Early life
Julien Schwarzer was born in the Marseille suburb of Saint-Barnabé in the 12th arrondissement of the city. His father is German and his mother French. His paternal grandfather was from Berlin, Germany. He moved with his family to Aubagne when he was 10.

Career
He started writing songs at 13 and rapping by age 15. He posted his material on the Skyblog site using the pseudonym Schneider, and in 2014 chose his stage name SCH. He became known in 2015 by appearing on Lacrim's mixtape R.I.P.R.O. Volume 1.

He released his first mixtape, A7, on 13 November 2015, certified gold with over 68,000 copies sold. Eight of the 14 tracks were produced by Katrina Squad and the other six by DJ Kore. Many of the tracks were co-written with the Toulouse beatmakers Guilty and DJ Ritmin. He released his first studio album, Anarchie, on 27 May 2016. The album was produced by DJ Kore, with compositions by DJ Bellek, Tshek, Double X, Mr Punisher and Ozhora Miyagi.

Discography

Studio albums

Mixtape

Singles

As lead artist

*Did not appear in the official Belgian Ultratop 50 charts, but rather in the bubbling under Ultratip charts.

As featured artist

*Did not appear in the official Belgian Ultratop 50 charts, but rather in the bubbling under Ultratip charts.

Other charted songs

*Did not appear in the official Belgian Ultratop 50 charts, but rather in the bubbling under Ultratip charts.

References

French rappers
1993 births
Living people
People from Aubagne
Rappers from Bouches-du-Rhône
French people of German descent